The Canadian Medical Association (CMA) is a national, voluntary association of physicians and medical learners that advocates on national health matters. Its primary mandate is to drive positive change in health care by advocating on key health issues facing doctors and their patients.

The Canadian Medical Association Journal (often abbreviated as CMAJ) is a peer-reviewed general medical journal that publishes original clinical research, commentaries, analyses and reviews of clinical topics, health news, and clinical-practice updates.

Membership
The CMA has over 75,000 members  and is the largest association of medical doctors in Canada. Its membership includes physicians and medical learners. The CMA represents Canadian physicians from medical school through to residency, medical practice and retirement.

History
The CMA's origins may rest with Dr. Joseph Painchaud and other Quebec physicians who in 1844 hoped to find ways to help physicians and, after their deaths, their widows and orphans. There were false starts in attempts to form an association, but soon after confederation, practicing physicians were successful in developing a national body.

The CMA's first president was Sir Charles Tupper, the Nova Scotia Premier who led that province into confederation and later became Prime Minister of Canada. The foundation of the CMA was strongly rooted in its Scottish origins as the first three presidents of the CMA graduated from the Edinburgh Medical School.

Among the CMA's founding principles in 1867 was to "improve public health and prevent disease and disability," a purpose which remains today.

The CMA Code of Ethics has been around in one form or another since 1868. As recently as 2015 this document was considered by the CMA to be "arguably the most important document produced by the CMA. It has a long and distinguished history of providing ethical guidance to Canada’s physicians. Focus areas include decision-making, consent, privacy, confidentiality, research and physician responsibilities. The code is updated every 5-6 years and has a major revision approximately every 20 years. Changes must be approved by CMA General Council."

The fledgling association faced a lot of growing pains in its first 25 years as meeting attendance was small. There was even a notice of motion in 1894 to disband it.

The Montreal Medical Journal was taken over in 1911 to become the CMA Journal.

In 1921, the CMA re-organized with the appointment of its first permanent general-secretary, Dr. T.C. Routley. The association also became more financially stable by raising funds with a bond issue.

Over the years, the CMA and its physician members have advocated on behalf of patients and educated the public to limit the effects of outbreaks, such as the 1918 Spanish flu, SARS in 2002 and the H1N1 influenza pandemic in 2009–2010.

In an effort to raise awareness and research treatment of cancer, the organisation formed the Canadian Cancer Society (CCS). The association provided most of the funds for the early years of the CCS based on interest generated from public donations made to a fund honoring King George V's silver jubilee.

Since the 1950s, the CMA has advised against tobacco use. It has fought against promotional tobacco marketing and for new laws that curbed smoking and other tobacco consumption among Canadians.

The CMA played an important role in medical assistance in dying (MAID) legislation, calling it one of the most complex and ethically challenging issues facing Canadian physicians. The CMA supports its members in exercising their freedom of conscience - both for those who chose to provide or participate in physician assisted suicide and those who do not.

The CMA also played a central role in the creation of the Registered Retirement Savings Plan in 1957 as a tool to provide its members financial security in retirement. MD Financial Management MD Financial Management was developed in 1969 to provide financial services to physicians and their families. It was sold in 2018 to Scotiabank, the sale including a 10-year collaboration agreement.

In 2018, the CMA ended its membership in the World Medical Association (WMA) to protest the plagiarism found in the speech of the WMA's incoming president.

Advocacy
As a national association of physicians and medical learners, the CMA often advocates on key health issues that matter to Canadians and its members. In developing its positions, it seeks input through town hall meetings, surveys its members and reviews relevant scientific research. It also seeks input from provincial and territorial medical associations and from its more than 60 affiliate, associate and stakeholder organizations.

Medically assisted death 
In 2015, the Supreme Court of Canada, in a unanimous decision, struck down the Criminal Code's absolute prohibition on physician-assisted death. As a result, the CMA developed foundational principles for medical aid in dying to guide discussions with its members and with the federal government on ensuring patient dignity and upholding the rights of both patients and physicians. Consultations included submissions and presentations to the federal External Panel on Options for a Legislative Response to Carter v. Canada, the House of Commons Standing Committee on Justice and Human Rights and Health Canada.

The CMA continues to work with government to address outstanding issues including medically assisted dying for mature minors and those who have mental illness as the sole underlying medical condition.

Public mobilization campaign 
In 2015 the CMA embarked on its first major public mobilization efforts. With a federal election happening that year, the CMA saw an opportunity to align with the public on an issue that mattered to both the public and physicians. Hence, Demand a Plan was born.

Demand a Plan is a public campaign spearheaded by the CMA with the aim of having all levels of government work together to develop a comprehensive national seniors strategy. Over 74,000 people have signed up in support of the campaign.

The Standing Committee on Human Resources, Skills and Social Development and the Status of Persons with Disabilities, in a report in March 2018, adopted many of the recommendations made the previous year by the CMA on ways to better serve seniors with improvements to housing, income security and quality of life.

The success of Demand a Plan brought on a new era of public mobilization at the CMA. Recognizing that there are many more issues that need to be rallied around, the CMA launched a second public mobilization platform called CMA Health Advocates. This platform is designed to bring Canadians together around a shared goal: improving health care. It enables them to engage and connect with their local politicians to share their health and health care stories. During the 2019 federal election, the CMA Health Advocates platform will be tracking each party's platform promises and creating opportunities for the public and its members to show their support.

Choosing Wisely Canada
Choosing Wisely Canada was launched by Dr. Wendy Levinson in 2014 in partnership with the CMA to help physicians and patients reduce unnecessary tests, treatments and procedures, and ensure high-quality care. Central to the campaign are lists  developed by more than 45 specialty societies to encourage critical thinking that will avoid unnecessary and potentially harmful tests and procedures. The federal government's Advisory Panel on Healthcare Innovation urged governments in all jurisdictions to support the initiative.

Drugs: Pharmacare, opioids and cannabis 
The CMA continues to advocate that Canadians should have access to medically necessary pharmaceuticals that are safe, effective, available when and where needed and reasonably priced.

The CMA is an active member of the Pan-Canadian Collaborative on Education for Improved Opioid Prescribing, which is chaired by the College of Family Physicians of Canada. The CMA's position is that opioids are important for managing pain, but prescribing them must be based on evidence and include careful assessment and monitoring. The CMA endorsed the collaborative's clinical guideline for opioids, initially published by CMAJ and updated in 2017 by the Michael G. DeGroote National Pain Centre.

The CMA identified potential risks of cannabis use and has addressed them in submissions to House of Commons standing committees. Following the introduction of the Cannabis Act, the association provided guidance to the federal government on a regulatory framework to protect children and youth.

Health and technology 
Advances in technology could bridge the physical divide between doctors and patients, thereby reducing wait times and health care costs. Technologies such as virtual reality, artificial intelligence and robotics hold significant promise for patients and physicians, particularly for a country like Canada with its large land base and numerous remote communities.

In early 2019, the CMA launched a Virtual Care Task Force alongside the Royal College of Physicians and Surgeons of Canada and the College of Family Physicians of Canada to explore the barriers affecting the effective implementation of virtual care in the Canadian health system. Recommendations are expected in early 2020.

Physician health and wellness 
Physician health and wellness has become a key priority of the CMA. In 2018, a national snapshot report released by the CMA showed that while physicians report high resiliency, they also experience high levels of burnout and depression, particularly residents and women.

To help respond to this growing issue, the CMA has implemented a physician health and wellness department led by Dr. Caroline Gérin-Lajoie. An environmental scan is underway to further identify key issues and possible solutions.

Controversy 
In 2009, the CMA was criticized for partnering with Pfizer to launch a continuing medical education program.

Provincial and territorial medical associations 
 Doctors of BC
 Alberta Medical Association
 Saskatchewan Medical Association
 Doctors Manitoba
 Ontario Medical Association
 Quebec Medical Association (French: Association médicale du Québec)
 New Brunswick Medical Society
 Doctors Nova Scotia
 Medical Society of PEI
 Newfoundland and Labrador Medical Association
 Northwest Territories Medical Association
 Yukon Medical Association

Corporate structure 
The size of the elected board of directors is transitioning to 19. The board includes physician, resident and student representatives. It is the executive authority of the CMA, meets four times a year and is responsible for policy direction.

In 2018, the association launched the CMA Patient Voice, a group of 12 individuals that provide a patient's perspective to the CMA's work.

A health summit attended by a wide spectrum of medical and health professionals as well as patient representatives is held annually to disseminate new research, information and innovations, and to debate issues facing the medical community and users of medical services.

A public annual general meeting is held to review financial statements and other CMA business matters. As well, the association holds an annual General Council meeting of its members to discuss policy matters.

Companies 
The CMA's subsidiary company Joule was created on Sept. 1, 2014. It delivers continuing education to doctors, resources for accessing medical information online, clinical information resources and summaries of the latest clinical evidence. CMAJ is published by Joule. Joule's grant program funds CMA member innovations that potentially may assist in healthcare advancements.

See also 
 Canadian Medical Association Journal
 Canadian Medical Protective Association
 James Thorburn: President, CMA, 1895
 List of Canadian organizations with royal patronage

References

External links 

 
 

1867 establishments in Ontario
Medical associations based in Canada
Organizations based in Canada with royal patronage
1867 establishments in Canada